William F. von Meister (February 21, 1942 – May 18, 1995) was an American entrepreneur who founded and participated in a number of startup ventures in the Washington, D.C., area.  These included The Source, an early online service and CompuServe competitor, and Control Video Corporation, a predecessor company to AOL.

Early years
William Ferdinand von Meister was born of noble German descent on February 21, 1942 in New York City, to F. W. von Meister and Eleanora Colloredo-Mannsfeld. His father, F. W. von Meister, was the godson of Kaiser Wilhelm II, and his mother was a countess.

William von Meister attended high school at Middlesex Academy in Massachusetts, and a finishing school in Switzerland. He then attended Georgetown University. Though he never completed his undergraduate education, he persuaded nearby American University to enroll him in its master's program for business.

Career
After leaving Georgetown in 1973, von Meister started a wholesale liquor company, but found it "boring" and decided to move into consulting. After creating a database for Litton Bionetics, he was hired by Western Union to create a computerized billing system.

In 1978, Meister founded The Source, the first popular online services company. The Source was eventually sold to Reader's Digest and later acquired by rivals CompuServe.

In 1983, Control Video Corporation was founded by Meister. The company originally ran the GameLine dial-up service for the Atari 2600, which Meister claimed to be able to handle up to 100,000 users.

Personal life and death
Meister has at least one brother, Peter.  Bill von Meister died of cancer in Great Falls, Virginia, at the age of 53, leaving behind his son, Frederick William von Meister.

Titles
As a descendent of Prussian nobility, William had the honour of carrying von in his last name.

References

Bibliography

Further reading
 Michael A. Banks (2008), On the Way to the Web: The Secret History of the Internet and Its Founders. Apress. .

External links
 The Story of a Pathological Entrepreneur
 Genealogy of William von Meister at the Luyken Family Association

1942 births
1995 deaths
Deaths from cancer in Virginia
People from Great Falls, Virginia
American Internet company founders
20th-century American businesspeople
Middlesex School alumni
Businesspeople from Virginia
Businesspeople from New York City
American people of German descent